The Beacon Heights are a small cluster of peaks between Beacon Valley and Arena Valley in Quartermain Mountains, Victoria Land, rising to  in West Beacon, and also including East Beacon and South Beacon. They were named by Hartley Ferrar, geologist with the British National Antarctic Expedition (1901–04). According to the USGS GNIS gazetteer, the heights were named after the Beacon Supergroup which caps them, though another source indicates that the type of rock was named after these hills.

References

 

Mountains of Victoria Land
Scott Coast